George Marcus Crothers (30 January 1909 – 5 February 1982) was an Irish cricketer. A right-handed batsman and wicket-keeper, he made his debut for the Ireland cricket team against Scotland in June 1931 and went on to play for them on 19 occasions, his last match coming in June 1948 against Yorkshire. Ten of his matches for Ireland had first-class status. Crothers captained Ireland once.

References

1909 births
1982 deaths
Irish cricketers
Irish cricket captains
Cricketers from Belfast
Cricketers from Northern Ireland
Wicket-keepers